O Yeong-su (born O Se-kang, October 19, 1944) is a South Korean actor. He began acting in theatre in the 1960s, and has, according to himself, appeared in over 200 productions. He later began acting in film and television, often portraying monks due to his experience with Buddhist plays.

In 2021, he portrayed Oh Il-nam in the Netflix survival drama Squid Game, which gave rise to his worldwide popularity and won him a Golden Globe Award for Best Supporting Actor in a Series, Miniseries or Television Film, as well as a nomination for the Primetime Emmy Award for Outstanding Supporting Actor in a Drama Series.

Early life
With the name O Se-kang, O was born in Kaepung County, Gyeonggi (modern-day Kaesong) in 1944. O's grandfather was a local educator and landlord. After the 38th parallel line was drawn across Korea, he and his family moved to Paju on the southern Korean side controlled by the American army. During the Korean War that followed shortly, his father was killed and his brother was kidnapped by North Korean forces.

Career

Theatre 
O began acting in 1963 as part of a theatre crew called "The Square". He was a member of the National Theater Company of Korea from 1987 to 2010, where he worked with actors such as Jang Min-ho, whom he considers his mentor. Throughout his career, he has done productions of A Confession for a Black Prostitute (흑인 창녀를 위한 고백, Albert Camus's play adaptation of the novel Requiem for a Nun by William Faulkner), A Streetcar Named Desire, and The Merchant of Venice, among many others. According to O, he had appeared in over 200 productions by 2013.

In his thirties, he played Faust in Goethe's Faust. In retrospect, he said he was probably too young for the role at the time. In his fifties, he played the titular Richard III. He said he was never satisfied with his performance because he felt like he was too old for the role. In his sixties, he expressed an interest to play Willy Loman in Death of a Salesman.

In 2014, O played Prospero in a National Theater of Korea production of William Shakespeare's The Tempest celebrating the 450th anniversary of Shakespeare's birth.

O played a Yeonguijeong in the play Prince Yeonsangun, and appeared in The Problematic Figure in July 2015 and as Vasíly in the play Fathers and Sons, based on the novel of the same name in August 2015.

In 2017, he played the titular King Lear in a production with the Daegu Metropolitan Theater Company. He had previously done a production of King Lear at the Daejeon Museum of Art in 2010.
In 2021, it was revealed that he would play the role of Sigmund Freud in the play "Freud's Last Session" by Mark St. Germain which is expected to start its first performance in Daehangno on January 7, 2022.

Film and television 
O often portrays monks on-screen. He credits his experience with Buddhist plays for getting him similar roles on film and television.

In 2021, he played Oh Il-nam in the Netflix original series Squid Game. The series, which became the most-watched show on Netflix worldwide in its first month of airing, drew newfound attention to O. In January 2022, he won the Golden Globe Award for Best Supporting Actor, Television for his role in the series. He became the first Korean actor to win a Golden Globe.

In November 2021, he narrated an episode of the documentary program "Documentary Three Days."

Other activities
On the first day of the 2021 Korean Series, O threw the first pitch.

In 2022, O was appointed ambassador for Korean performance tourism by Park Bo-gyoon, Minister of Culture, Sports and Tourism.

Personal life 
On November 25, 2022, prosecutors in Suwon announced that O had been indicted on sexual misconduct charges relating to an incident in 2017.

Filmography

Commercials
 "Episode 18, the relationship that grows as we stay" (제18화 머물수록 커지는 인연)(2015) (ad for SK Telecom,with Kim Seol-hyun)

Theatre

Film

Television

Television

Accolades

Awards

State honors

See also 
 Late Blossom (2011)—A film adaptation of the play I Love You (2010) that O was in.

References

External links 
 
 
 

1944 births
Living people
People from Gyeonggi Province
People from Kaesong
South Korean male stage actors
South Korean male television actors
South Korean male film actors
Male actors from Seoul
20th-century South Korean male actors
21st-century South Korean male actors
Best Supporting Actor Golden Globe (television) winners
Best Actor Paeksang Arts Award (theatre) winners